The Pepperdine University Rick J. Caruso School of Law (formerly Pepperdine University School of Law) is the law school of Pepperdine University, a private research university in Los Angeles County, California. The school offers the Juris Doctor (JD), and various Masters of Laws (LLM) options in Dispute Resolution, International Commercial Arbitration, United States Law, and Entertainment, Media, and Sports Law.  The school also offers joint degrees with its JD and Master of Dispute Resolution (MDR) in partnership with other Pepperdine University graduate schools. The school now offers an online Master of Legal Studies program and an online Master of Dispute Resolution program.

The school is known for its Straus Institute of Dispute Resolution, which is ranked 2nd in the nation by U.S. News & World Report for 2020. The School of Law's other institutes include: the Parris Institute for Professional Formation; the Byrne Judicial Clerkship Institute; the Nootbaar Institute on Law, Religion, and Ethics; and the Palmer Center for Entrepreneurship and the Law.

Through the Parris Institute, the school pairs students with a practicing attorney or judicial alumni through the students' 1L year.  It also provides its students numerous clinics and externship opportunities in the greater Los Angeles area, along with its global justice programs in Uganda and India.  Additionally, students have opportunities to study at Pepperdine's London, England, and Washington D.C. campuses.

On October 23, 2019, Pepperdine announced that the school had received a $50 million gift from billionaire alumnus Rick Caruso that would provide scholarships and loan-forgiveness for needy students. The school would subsequently be known as the Rick J. Caruso School of Law.

Admissions
For the class entering in 2021, the school accepted 24.97% of applicants, with 18.17% of those accepted enrolling. The average class LSAT score was 164 and average  undergraduate GPA was 3.8.

Costs
The total cost of attendance, which includes the cost of tuition, fees, and living expenses at Pepperdine Law for the 2017-2018 academic year is $81,260. Assuming no scholarship or tuition discounts, Law School Transparency estimated that the debt-financed cost of attendance for three years would total $305,817.

Pepperdine Law currently participates in the "Yellow Ribbon" program, which matches Veterans' Post-9/11 GI Bill benefits to cover 100% of all costs and fees for veterans who enroll at the law school.

Accreditation, ranking, and post-graduation employment
Accreditation: Pepperdine University School of Law has been accredited by the American Bar Association (ABA) since 1972, holds membership in the Association of American Law Schools (AALS), and is accredited by the Committee of Bar Examiners, State Bar of California. 

Rankings: For its 2023 ranking, U.S. News & World Report ranked the school 52nd of 199 ABA accredited U.S. law schools.

Employment Outcomes: According to Class of 2019 data from the ABA, 75.3% of graduates obtained full-time, long term positions requiring bar admission (i.e., jobs as lawyers), 9 months after graduation.

Herbert and Elinor Nootbaar Institute on Law, Religion and Ethics
The purpose of the Nootbaar Institute on Law, Religion, and Ethics includes three initiatives:
Scholarship with respect to issues at the intersection of law and religion;
Domestic Justice Initiatives, such as the Legal Aid Clinic and the Asylum and Refugee Clinic; and
the Global Justice Program.

Sudreau Global Justice Program
The Sudreau Global Justice Program has initiatives in international human rights and religious freedom; advancement of the rule of law; and global development. In 2017, Pepperdine Law announced the endowment of the Program made possible by the generosity of alumna Laure Sudreau (JD ’97). The $8 million contribution is the largest single endowment gift ever to the School of Law and will help advance the profound impact of the Global Justice Program, which operates within the Herbert and Elinor Nootbaar Institute on Law, Religion, and Ethics at the School of Law.

Straus Institute for Dispute Resolution
Pepperdine University School of Law’s Straus Institute for Dispute Resolution provides professional training and academic programs in dispute resolution including a Certificate, Masters in Dispute Resolution (MDR) and Masters of Laws in Dispute Resolution (LLM). The Straus Institute provides education to law and graduate students, as well as mid-career professionals in areas of mediation, negotiation, arbitration, international dispute resolution and peacemaking. The Institute has consistently ranked as the number one dispute resolution school in the nation for the past 13 years.

Journals
 Pepperdine Law Review
 Dispute Resolution Law Journal
 Journal of the National Association of Administrative Law Judiciary (NAALJ)
 Journal of Business, Entrepreneurship, and the Law (JBEL)

Joint degree programs
Pepperdine Law offers six joint degrees, which include the JD/MBA, JD/M.Div., JD/Master of Public Policy (MPP), JD/ Master of Dispute Resolution (MDR), MDR/MPP, and MDR/MBA.

Online programs

Online Master of Legal Studies Program 
Pepperdine Law offers a Master of Legal Studies (MLS) degree online with an optional concentration in dispute resolution. The program is designed for non-lawyers who work with the law in some capacity and need a foundation in legal concepts and procedures. Students take courses on contracts, regulatory compliance, civil procedure, and intellectual property, among others. Students meet weekly in live, online classes with Pepperdine Law faculty members to discuss and debate legal topics.

Online Master of Dispute Resolution Program 
The online Master of Dispute Resolution (MDR) program is designed for professionals who want to become more effective leaders and problem solvers by learning to resolve workplace conflict, prevent obstacles, and negotiate complex transactions. All dispute resolution courses are offered through Pepperdine Law's Straus Institute, which was ranked by U.S. News & World Report.

Notable people

Deans
Ronald F. Phillips (1970 - 1997)
Richardson R. Lynn (1997 - 2003)
Charles Nelson (2003 - 2004)
Ken Starr (2004 - 2010)
Thomas G. Bost (2010 - 2011)
Deanell Reece Tacha (2011 - 2017)
Paul L. Caron (2017–present)

Faculty
 Nancy D. Erbe (LLM, JD) — Former Faculty (2000-2003). Professor, Fulbright Scholar (Four Fulbright Awards including Fulbright Distinguished Chair), and expert in conflict resolution.
 Colleen Graffy — Former United States Deputy Assistant Secretary of State for Public Diplomacy for Europe and Eurasia
 Amb. Douglas Kmiec — Former White House Counsel to Presidents Ronald Reagan and George H.W. Bush, and Former Ambassador to Malta
 Edward Larson — Pulitzer Prize–winning author
 Grant S. Nelson — Specialist in real estate law
 Ken Starr — Former Dean, former D.C. Circuit Court of Appeals Judge, and former United States Solicitor General
 Deanell Reece Tacha — Former Dean and retired Chief Judge of the Tenth Circuit Court of Appeals
 Ben Stein — Former faculty (1990–1997), writer, lawyer, actor, and commentator
 L. Timothy Perrin — Former faculty (1992–2012) and president of Lubbock Christian University (2012–2019)
 Jim Gash — Eighth president of Pepperdine University

Visiting faculty
 Samuel Alito — Associate Justice of the Supreme Court of the United States
 Akhil Amar — expert in constitutional law, professor at Yale Law School
 Bob Goff — NY Times bestselling author and humanitarian
 Gary Haugen — CEO of the International Justice Mission
 Antonin Scalia — Associate Justice of the Supreme Court of the United States
 Roger Cossack — Former legal analyst at ESPN

Notable alumni
 C. David Baker — President & CEO of the Pro Football Hall of Fame.
 André Birotte Jr., 1991 — United States District Judge in the Central District of California.
 Rod Blagojevich, 1983 — Former Governor of Illinois (2003–2009).
Raymond Boucher, 1984 — Noted trial attorney. 
Derek Brown, 2000 — Chairman of the Utah Republican Party and former member of the Utah House of Representatives. 
 Jeffrey S. Boyd, 1991 — Justice of the Texas Supreme Court, 2012–present.
 Ronald B. Cameron, 1973 — Former Congressman for California's 25th congressional district. 
 Rick J. Caruso, 1983 — CEO of Caruso Affiliated.
 Mark J. Caruso, 1982 — State Representative New Mexico Legislature, 1991–1995.
Mike Cernovich, 2004 — Political commentator, social media personality, and conspiracy theorist.
 Rich Cho, 1997 — General Manager of the Charlotte Hornets.
 Travis Clardy, 1988 — Member of the Texas House of Representatives, 2012–Present.
 Talis J. Colberg, 1983 — Attorney General of Alaska, 2006–2009.
 Chris DeRose (author), 2004 — New York Times Bestselling Author, law professor, and political strategist.
 Jennifer A. Dorsey, 1997 — United States District Judge for the United States District Court for the District of Nevada.
 Nancy D. Erbe (LLM) — Professor, Fulbright Scholar, and expert in conflict resolution.
 Charles R. Eskridge III, 1990 — United States District Judge in the Southern District of Texas.
 Adam Firestone, 1986 — Co-Founder of Firestone Walker Brewing Company.
 James Hahn, 1975 — Mayor of Los Angeles, 2001–2005.
 April Haney — Actress known for her roles in Annie and Charles in Charge.
 Randall Hicks — Adoption attorney, author, and novelist. Winner of the 2006 Gumshoe Award.
Edward C. Hugler — Acting Secretary of Labor under both Presidents Barack Obama and Donald Trump.
 Faith Ireland, 2005 (Straus Institute Certificate) – Former Justice of the Washington Supreme Court.  
 Candice Jackson, 2002 – Former acting Assistant Secretary of Education for the Office for Civil Rights, Author, Media Figure.
 Brent A. Jones, 1991 — Republican member of the Nevada Assembly.
 Theodore Kanavas — Former member of the Wisconsin State Senate, 2001-2010.
 Lisa Katselas, 1985 - Film Producer and BAFTA Award Nominee
 Mike Leach, 1986 — College football coach at several schools, former head coach at Mississippi State University. 
 Rachel Luba, 2016 - Sports agent and founder of Luba Sports. 
Tiffany Monroe, - Chief People & Culture Officer of H&R Block.
Eileen C. Moore, 1978 — Justice of the California Court of Appeal.
 Montgomery "Monty" Moran — Former CEO of Chipotle Mexican Grill.
Greg Nibert — Member of the New Mexico House of Representatives, 2017–Present.
 Wiley Nickel — Member of the North Carolina State Senate and former White House staffer. 
 Beverly Reid O'Connell, 1990 — United States District Judge for the United States District Court for the Central District of California.
Geoffrey Palmer — Billionaire real estate developer.
 Behram V. Parekh, 1992 — Noted Mass Tort lawyer.
 Kate Payne, 1989 — Bioethicist and professor at Vanderbilt University. 
 Amy Peikoff — Chief Policy Officer of Parler.  Attended first year at Pepperdine Law before transferring to UCLA. 
 Doug Peterson, 1985 — Attorney General of Nebraska, 2015–present.
 Jason Peterson — Chairman of GoDigital Media Group.
 Todd Russell Platts, 1991 — U.S. Congressman from Pennsylvania, 2001–2013.
 Pierre-Richard Prosper, 1989 — United States Ambassador-at-Large for War Crimes Issues, 2001–2005.
 Michael Reardon – Famous rock climber, and former head of business affairs at Harvey Entertainment.
Michael Reinstein — Chairman of Regent Private Equity. 
Charles Rettig — Commissioner of Internal Revenue, head of the IRS, 2018–present.
Steve Roberts – Missouri State Senator.
 Margo A. Rocconi, 1991 — United States Magistrate Judge for the Central District of California.
 Rachel Rossi — Former counsel to Senator Dick Durbin. Candidate for LA County District Attorney.
Meredith Salenger (Straus Institute Certificate) — Actress, vocalist and mediator. Known for her roles in The Journey of Natty Gann, Dream a Little Dream, and as Barriss Offee in Star Wars: The Clone Wars.
Jenna Sanz-Agero, 1995. — Media executive and former member of the band Vixen. 
Robin Sax, 1997 — Author, legal analyst, and former prosecutor.
Troy Slaten — Attorney, media pundit, and former child actor in Cagney & Lacey and Parker Lewis Can't Lose.
Izabella St. James — Reality TV star. Former girlfriend of Hugh Hefner.
Brian Tucker (MDR) – Businessman and Real Estate Developer. 
Ted Weggeland — California State Assemblyman, 1992-1996.
 Judy Wood, 1981 — Immigration lawyer who helped make women a protected class under United States asylum law. Her story was profiled in Saint Judy, a major motion picture starring Michelle Monaghan as Wood.
Edward Ulloa, 1995 — Prosecutor who handled many of the first internet child sexual predator cases.
 Ehsan Zaffar, 2007 — Senior government advisor, law professor, and author.

Honor societies
The School of Law attained membership in the Order of the Coif in 2008.

The School of Law has hosted a chapter of The Order of Barristers since 1985.

Pepperdine School of Law is also home to the Prosser Inn of Phi Delta Phi, the International Legal Honor Society.  Members must achieve standing in the top thirty percent of their class to be considered for membership.

References

External links
 

ABA-accredited law schools in California
School of Law
Educational institutions established in 1971